The 1994 Montreal municipal election took place on November 6, 1994. Pierre Bourque was elected to his first term as mayor, defeating incumbent Jean Doré. Elections were also held in Montreal's suburban communities.

Results

Mayor

Council (incomplete)
Party colours do not indicate affiliation or resemblance to a provincial or a federal party.

Information on the candidates
Montreal Citizens' Movement
Michel L'Allier (Ahuntsic), Donato Caivano (Saint-Michel), and Lise Brunet (François-Perrault) were first-time candidates.
Montrealers' Party
Michel Bureau (Ahuntsic) was a first-time candidate.
Antoinette Corrado (Jean-Rivard) was a first-time candidate. She later sought election to the English Montreal School Board in 2007 as an ally of commission chair Dominic Spiridigliozzi.
Democratic Coalition–Ecology Montreal
Jean-Pierre Le Blanc (Ahuntsic) was a first-time candidate.
Michele A. Benigno (Saint-Michel) fought for the closure of the Miron landfill in the 1994 election. She later sought election to the English Montreal School Board in 2003 and lost to Rocco Barbieri. Four years later, she ran as part of Barbieri's electoral alliance and was again defeated.
Pietro Bozzo (Jean-Rivard) was a first-time candidate. He later served as executive director of the Yellow Door, an activist resource center.
Mario Laquerre (François-Perrault) is a specialist in urban affairs. He studied possible uses for the abandoned Francon Quarry in north-end Montreal during the 1990s and, in the 1994 campaign, articulated his party's position that parts of the quarry could be converted to a giant urban campsite. Laquerre also co-ordinated a local residents group that opposed the Miron quarry landfill site, an active garbage dump located within the city limits. After the 1994 election, he served as president of the Front Commun Québécois pour une Gestion Écologique des Déchets (which sought to limit the shipment of garbage among Quebec's regions) and worked for the group RECYQ-QUÉBEC.
Independents
Ghassan Saba (Ahuntsic) had previously been a Montreal Citizens' Movement candidate in the 1990 municipal election. A newspaper report from that election listed him as a thirty-eight-year-old investment counsellor.

Suburban results

Dorval
All members of the Dorval city council were re-elected without opposition.

Source: "Who's running where in Nov. 6 elections," Montreal Gazette, October 20, 1994, F2.

Montreal North

Source: "Voting Results: The Final Count," Montreal Gazette, November 8, 1994, A4.

Saint-Leonard

Information on candidates in suburban communities
Independents
Joseph Mormina is a Montreal entrepreneur. He sought election to the Saint-Leonard city council in 1978 and 1982 as a candidate of the Équipe du renouveau de la cité de Saint-Léonard and was narrowly defeated both times. When his party fragmented in 1984, Mormina joined the Action civique de Saint-Léonard and supported Domenico Moschella's bid to become mayor of Saint-Leonard in a municipal by-election. Action civique later folded into Unité de Saint-Léonard, and Mormina ran unsuccessfully for the latter party in the 1986 municipal election. He ran as an independent in 1994.

Results in other Montreal-area communities

Longueuil
Parti municipal de Longueuil leader Claude Gladu was elected to his first term as mayor, succeeding Roger Ferland. The Parti municipal won fourteen seats on council, while former mayor Jacques Finet's Alliance de Longueuil won the remaining six.

Source: Le Parti municipal de Longueuil: "Roger Ferland, le gestionnaire", Société historique et culturelle du Marigot, accessed February 27, 2014.

References

1994 Quebec municipal elections
Municipal elections in Montreal
1990s in Montreal
1994 in Quebec